Anillaco is a municipality and village in La Rioja Province in northwestern Argentina. It is mostly known for being the birthplace of former Argentina President Carlos Menem.

References

Populated places in La Rioja Province, Argentina
Cities in Argentina
Argentina
La Rioja Province, Argentina